Day Day Up (pinyin: Tiāntiān xiàngshàng) is a popular Chinese talk show broadcast on Hunan Television. The show is co-hosted by Wang Han (汪涵), Da Zhangwei (大张伟), Qian Feng (钱枫), and Wang Yibo (王一博). It has drawn great attention from the public, especially student groups and other young people, for its humor, style, and the public figures who appear as guests.

The Chinese title of the show "tiāntiān xiàngshàng" (天天向上) was inspired from a Chinese idiom coined by Mao Zedong, "study hard and make progress every day" (好好学习，天天向上; hǎohāo xuéxí, tiāntiān xiàngshàng) which is literally translated as "study well, move up day by day".

Background
The talk show was created by the original team behind "More Talk More Happiness" (越策越开心). The impetus behind the creation of Day Day Up was that with the 'decline of traditional virtues and etiquette' in China leading up to the 21st Century, the show would play an active role in conveying traditional Chinese values to viewers. This would allow people to enjoy learning about Chinese traditions, especially of the arrival of the 2008 Beijing Olympic Games around the time of the show's release. It employs both the young and the old for its humorous hosts in order to convey Chinese traditional values.

Pre-launch marketing 
Prior to the release of the talk show, Hunan Television launched a series of marketing campaigns to increase the show's exposure. This was done through multiple 'prequel shows' (天天向上前传 or 'Day Day Up Prequels'). Starting from 8 August 2008, daily broadcasts of the show were shown to familiarise audience members with the format of the show and to raise interest towards the show's topics of discussion. In each of these episodes, there would be an opening show, six classes, and finally a talk from the 'Headmaster' (host of the show).

New Format during COVID-19
With the coronavirus outbreak, as it is advisable to stay indoors to reduce the risks of being exposed to the virus, the show got creative by conducting a new format called "Cloud Filming".

List of episodes

2008

2009

2010

2011

2012

2013

2014

2015

2016

2017

2018

2019

2020

References

External links
  
 《天天向上》Day Day UP - 中国湖南卫视官方频道 China HunanTV Official Channel - YouTube
 
 天天向上 新浪博客 

Chinese television talk shows
Chinese television shows
2010s Chinese television series
2008 Chinese television series debuts
Hunan Television original programming
Mandarin-language television shows